Coelorhyncidia flammealis is a moth in the family Crambidae. It is found in Ecuador.

References

Moths described in 1917
Spilomelinae